Golden Mosque can refer to:

 Sunehri Masjid, Lahore
 Sunehri Masjid (Chandni Chowk)
 Sunehri Masjid (Red Fort)
 Al-Askari Mosque in Iraq
 Masjid Al-Dahab in the Philippines
 Dian Al-Mahri Mosque in Indonesia

Mosque disambiguation pages